Sai or SAI may refer to:

Companies
 Science Applications Incorporated, original name of Leidos
 ICAO designator for Shaheen Air, a Pakistani airline
 Skandinavisk Aero Industri, a former Danish aeroplane manufacturer
 Software Architects, Inc., a North American computer software company
 Springfield Armory, Inc., an American firearm manufacturer and importer
 Supersonic Aerospace International, an American aerospace firm

Fiction
 Fujiwara no Sai, a character in Hikaru no Go media
 Sai (Naruto), a character in Naruto media
 Hinoki Sai, a character in the Betterman universe
 Sai Akuto, protagonist of Ichiban Ushiro no Dai Maō
 Sai Argyle, a fictional character in the manga and anime Gundam series
 Sai, a term of respect in Stephen King's The Dark Tower universe
 Sai no Hanaya, a character in the Yakuza series

Government 
 Solar America Initiative
 Sports Authority of India, an Indian government body
 Supreme audit institution, a government audit body

Media
 Sai music, a traditional style of music from southern Chad
 Scaled and Icy (2021), sixth studio album by the American musical duo, Twenty One Pilots

Military 
 Senior Army Instructor, in United States Army Junior ROTC
 South African Infantry Corps
 Sai (weapon), a traditional Japanese melee weapon

Places
 Sai, Orne, a French village and commune
 Sai, Bhiwani,  Haryana, India
 Sai (Mawal), a village in Pune district, Maharashtra, India
 Sai, Raebareli, a village in Uttar Pradesh, India
 Sai, Aomori, a village in Japan
 Lake Sai, one of the Fuji Five Lakes in Japan
 Saï (island), on the Nile in Sudan
 Sai River (disambiguation)

Organisations
 SAI Global, Australian standards organisation
 Sathya Sai Organization, religious organization
 Scout Association of Ireland, 1908-2004
 SAI Ambrosini, an Italian aircraft manufacturer
 Society of American Indians, 1911-1923
 Society of Architectural Illustrators
 Sweet Adelines International, women barbershop singers

People

Groups
 Sai people or Li people, a minority Chinese ethnic group
 Sai (caste)

Given name
 Sai Kiran Adivi, Indian film director and producer
 Sai Prathap Annayyagari (born 1944), Indian politician
 Sai Deodhar (born 1984), Indian television actor
 Sai Mauk Kham (born 1950), ethnic Shan politician and one of the two vice presidents of Myanmar
 Sai Kiran (born 1978), Indian actor who works in the Telugu film industry
 Sai Wing Mock (1879–1941), New York Chinese criminal and leader of the Hip Sing Tong
 Sai Pallavi  (born 1992), Indian actress 
 Sai Paranjpye (born 1938), Indian movie director and screenwriter
 Sai Sam Tun, owner of the Loi Hein Co, Ltd. of Myanmar
 Sai Yinjiya (born 1976), male Chinese freestyle wrestler

Surname
 Anand Sai, Indian art director who works for Telugu films
 Manoj Sai, Indian cricketer
 Marlene Sai (born 1941), Hawaiian singer
 Nand Kumar Sai (born 1946), Indian politician from Chhattisgarh state
 Obodai Sai (born 1984), Ghanaian boxer
 Sai On (1682–1761), scholar-official of the Ryūkyū Kingdom
 Ryouji Sai (born 1980), Japanese professional wrestler
 Veer Surendra Sai (died 1884), Indian freedom fighter
 Vishnudeo Sai (born 1964), member of the 14th Lok Sabha of India
 Yōichi Sai (born 1949), Japanese film director

Other people
 Sai, real name Simon Wimmerberg, DJ/producer with the band Labyrint
 Sai Htee Saing (1950–2008), Burmese singer and songwriter of Shan descent
 Sai Maa (born 1953), Mauritian guru

Research institutes
 University of Texas at Austin South Asia Institute, USA
 South Asia Institute (Germany)
 Stan Ackermans Institute, in the Dutch city of Eindhoven
 Sternberg Astronomical Institute, a division of Moscow State University in Russia

Science and technology
 SAI (software), painting software
 Serving area interface, or service area interface, an outdoor telecommunications cabinet
 Silent Aircraft Initiative, Cambridge-MIT Institute project 
Single-collateral Dai (cryptocurrency), discontinued
 Stratospheric aerosol injection in climate engineering
 Subject–auxiliary inversion in linguistics

Other uses
 Sai (deity), an Egyptian god
 Steering Axis Inclination, a secondary wheel alignment measurement
 Toyota Sai, alternate name for the Lexus HS hybrid car
 Self-assessed intelligence

See also
 Sai Baba (disambiguation), an honorific term for ascetics in India
 Sais (disambiguation)